Edward Terry may refer to:
Edward A. Terry (1839–1882), American naval officer
Edward O'Connor Terry (1844–1912), English actor
Edward Terry (author) (1590–1660), English writer
Edward Terry (politician) (1840–1907), Australian politician
Ted Terry (1904–1967), Australian athlete and footballer
Ted Terry (politician) (born 1983), American politician in the state of Georgia